Tuncheng  is a town and the administrative seat of Tunchang County in Hainan, China.  It lies along the G224 highway, about 80 kilometres from Haikou.  The town is characterized by a number of botanical gardens with water features. There are also crystal mines in Tunchang.
In 1992 the town had a population of 14,974 people living in 78 villages.

Administrative divisions
The town contains the following communities and villages:

Wen'an Community  	
Xinjian Community  	
Dongfeng Community 
Haizhong Community 	
Xinnan Community	() 	
Wenzhong Community  	
Wenxin Community	() 	
Chengbei Community 
Tunchang Village 	
Tunxin Village	() 
Yuezhai Village	() 
Liangshi Village	 	
Guangming Village 	
Shuikou Village 	
Wendan Village	 
Jiabao Village 	
Dadong Village	() 	
Dachangpo Village 	
Dashi Village 	
Pingpo Village 	
Sanfa Village 	
Xinchang Village 	
Datong Village	() 	
Dadong Village	() 	
Dalupo Village	() 	
Longshui Village 	
Haijun Village 
Haixin Village

See also
List of township-level divisions of Hainan

References

Township-level divisions of Hainan
County seats in Hainan